The Dataverse is an open source web application to share, preserve, cite, explore and analyze research data. Researchers, data authors, publishers, data distributors, and affiliated institutions all receive appropriate credit via a data citation with a persistent identifier (e.g., DOI, or handle).

A Dataverse repository hosts multiple dataverses. Each dataverse contains dataset(s) or other dataverses, and each dataset contains descriptive metadata and data files (including documentation and code that accompany the data). 

In 2019, Dataverse won the Duke's Choice Award for university and higher education.

Background 
The Dataverse Project is housed and developed by the Dataverse Team at the Institute for Quantitative Social Science (IQSS) at Harvard University. Coding of the Dataverse (previously known as Dataverse Network) software began in 2006 under the leadership of Mercè Crosas and Gary King. The earlier Virtual Data Center (VDC) project, which spanned 1999-2006, was organized by Micah Altman, Gary King, and Sidney Verba as a collaboration between the Harvard-MIT Data Center (now part of IQSS) and the Harvard University Library. Precursors to the VDC date to 1987, comprising such entities as a stand-alone software guide to local data, preweb software, and tools to transfer cataloging information by FTP to other sites across campus automatically at designated times.

Installations

Harvard Dataverse 
A collaboration with the Institute for Quantitative Social Science (IQSS), the Harvard Library, and Harvard University Information Technology (HUIT): the Harvard Dataverse is a repository for sharing, citing, analyzing, and preserving research data. It is open to all scientific data from all disciplines worldwide.

Dataverse in Europe 
Dataverse is also installed in the countries of the European Union to preserve data collected by research communities of Netherlands, Germany, France and Finland. The largest Dataverse repository is called DataverseNL and located in the Netherlands providing data management services for 11 Dutch Universities. A similar service is being developed in Norway (cf. DataverseNO).

Dataverse installations around the world 
There are several other Dataverse repositories installed in Universities and organizations around the world. Here is a list of some Dataverse repositories:
The Austrian Social Science Data Archive (AUSSDA)
Odum Institute
Dutch Universities (dataverse.nl operated by DANS)
Fudan University
University of Alberta Libraries
Department of Cross Cultural and Regional Studies, University of Copenhagen (ToRS)
ABACUS - British Columbia Research Libraries' Data Services
Scholars Portal - Ontario Council of University Libraries (OCUL)
HeiDATA - Heidelberg University
DataverseNO (Norwegian universities)
CIRAD Dataverse (France)
DataSuds (France)
The Australian Data Archive

APIs and interoperability
The Dataverse currently has multiple open APIs available, which allow for searching, depositing and accessing data.

Alternatives and similar projects 
DSpace is often compared with Dataverse and is used for storing scientific data. CKAN provides similar functions and is widely used for open data.

See also 
Data citation
Data sharing
Micah Altman

References

External links
The Dataverse Project
The Harvard Dataverse
The DataverseNL Data Repository (Netherlands)
DataverseNO - Dataverse Network Norway
Map of Dataverse repositories around the world 

Harvard Library
Open science
Open data
Open-access archives
Open access (publishing)
Academic publishing
Data publishing
Scholarly communication